Anthony Hollis Gray (born 23 May 1963) is a former West Indian cricketer who played five Tests and 25 One Day Internationals.

Gray was a tall fast bowler who hails from Trinidad. Despite his impressive average of 17.13 in Tests and a superb performance in the Indian subcontinent, Gray had limited opportunities due to persistent injuries and the presence of Malcolm Marshall, Joel Garner, Courtney Walsh and later Curtly Ambrose in the team.

Career
Gray represented Trinidad & Tobago between 1984 and 1995. He  played for Surrey in the English County Championship between 1985 and 1990 and also played for Western Transvaal in South Africa for the 1993–94 season.

Gray played his 5 Tests in the 1986–87 season versus Pakistan and New Zealand. He played 25 One Day Internationals between 1985 and 1991 with a best of 6-50 v Australia on his home ground Port of Spain.

After the end of his career Gray went on to coach the Trinidad and Tobago team at youth as well as senior levels and at the University of Trinidad and Tobago. Gray also works a commentator upon coverage and shows based upon cricket.

Personal life
Gray is a fan of English football team Manchester United.

References

External links
 Wisden Profile

1963 births
Living people
Surrey cricketers
Gauteng cricketers
Trinidad and Tobago cricketers
West Indies One Day International cricketers
West Indies Test cricketers
Cricketers from Port of Spain
Trinidad and Tobago expatriates in the United Kingdom
Trinidad and Tobago expatriates in South Africa